The 1992–94 FIRA Trophy was arranged with a new format. Ten teams were admitted to first division and divided into two pools to play a "Preliminary Tournament", that qualified five teams to play for the Trophy in the 1993–1994 season. France and Italy were the winners of Pools A and B. Russia and Romania also qualified as the runners-up.

Pool A 

 France and Russia qualified for Pool Title 1993–94
 Morocco qualified to Barrage
 Germany and Belgium qualified to the Pool for 6th place 1993–94

Pool B 

 Italy and Romania qualified for Pool Title 1993–94
 Spain qualified to Barrage
 Tunisia and Portugal qualified to the Pool for 6th place 1993–94

Barrage 

 Spain qualified for Title Pool.

References

Bibliography 
 Francesco Volpe, Valerio Vecchiarelli (2000), 2000 Italia in Meta, Storia della nazionale italiana di rugby dagli albori al Sei Nazioni, GS Editore (2000) .
 Francesco Volpe, Paolo Pacitti (Author), Rugby 2000, GTE Gruppo Editorale (1999).

External links
1992-93 FIRA Preliminary Tournament at ESPN

Preliminary93
1992–93 in European rugby union
1992 rugby union tournaments for national teams
1993 rugby union tournaments for national teams